Double Team may refer to:

Double team, a defensive strategy in basketball
Double Team (film), a 1997 action movie starring Jean-Claude Van Damme, Dennis Rodman and Mickey Rourke
"Double Team", a song by Tenacious D from their 2001 album Tenacious D
Double team is a specific variation of a threesome sexual behavior, which is a form of group sex.
Double teaming is the act of combining two forces to get past, kill, or distract one force so another team can get past.